The New York Stars were a team that played for the first two of three seasons in the Women's Professional Basketball League. The team won the 1979-80 league championship in its second season, defeating the Iowa Cornets.

The league began with a player draft held in Manhattan's Essex House in July 1978, with eight teams participating. The Stars drafted Althea Gwyn and Debbie "The Pearl" Mason, who had played collegiate basketball locally at Queens College. The team played the inaugural season at the Iona College gymnasium in New Rochelle, New York and its second season at Madison Square Garden. Twins Faye and Kaye Young, who had played together at both Peace College and North Carolina State University, played together for both seasons that the Stars were in existence.

The team finished the 1978–79 season with a record of 19 wins and 15 losses, placing second of four teams in the league's Eastern Division. In the first round of the playoffs the Stars were swept in two games by the Houston Angels, who would go on to win the first league championship, losing the final game by a score of 93–84 despite 38 points from Althea Gwyn.

In the 1979–80 season the team finished with a record of 28 wins and seven losses, the highest winning percentage of any team in league history, finishing in first place in the six-team Eastern Division (though two teams, the Washington Metros and the Philadelphia Fox, had disbanded after 10 games). The Stars earned a bye in the first round and played the San Francisco Pioneers in the semifinals, sweeping the series in two games. On April 9, 1980, despite Iowa's league-leading scorer Molly Bolin's 36 point, the New York Stars held on to win game four of the finals 125–114, behind 27 points by Pearl Moore and 22 by Janice Thomas. Stars coach Dean Meminger, a former professional basketball player who had played for the New York Knicks, called the game the "culmination of a year of hard work" and was honored as the league's Coach of the Year.

As it turned out, that game would be the last one the Stars ever played.  Despite their strong season, the Stars were on shaky financial ground.  They asked to go inactive for two years in order to rebuild their fortunes.  However, this came undone when the league collapsed after the 1980–81 season.

References

Basketball teams in New York City
Defunct sports teams in New York City
Women's Professional Basketball League teams
1978 establishments in New York City
1980 disestablishments in New York (state)
Basketball teams established in 1978
Basketball teams disestablished in 1980
Women in New York City
Women's sports in New York (state)